National Institute of Electronics and Information Technology (NIELIT), formerly known as the DOEACC Society, is a society that offers Information Technology and Electronics training at different levels. It is an autonomous scientific society under the administrative control of Ministry of Electronics and Information Technology, Government of India.

NIELIT currently has 47 centers across the country, with its headquarters at New Delhi.

References

External links 
Official website
Official website (Main Common Website)

Ministry of Communications and Information Technology (India)
Scientific societies based in India
Electronics industry in India
1994 establishments in Delhi
Educational institutions established in 1994
Education in Patna